Pol Khatun Rural District is a rural district (dehestan) in Marzdaran District, Sarakhs County, Razavi Khorasan Province, Iran. At the 2006 census, its population was 5,821, in 1,122 families.  The rural district has 18 villages.

References 

Rural Districts of Razavi Khorasan Province
Sarakhs County